The Clark Avenue Railroad Underpass, also known as the Bonanza Underpass, is a bridge and underpass in Las Vegas, Nevada, United States that is listed on the National Register of Historic Places. The bridge is so named since at the time of construction it crossed Clark Avenue which was later renamed to Bonanza Road. The underpass is currently part of Nevada State Route 579.

Historic significance 
It is significant as the underpass allowed for access between Las Vegas and the settlements west of the city. Previously, it was a dangerous undertaking to cross the Union Pacific Railroad (ex-San Pedro, Los Angeles and Salt Lake Railroad) tracks.

History 
The bridge was constructed in 1937 by the Works Progress Administration.  The structure has changed over time, primarily due to a widening project on Bonanza Road.

References 

National Register of Historic Places in Las Vegas
Union Pacific Railroad
Works Progress Administration in Nevada
Art Deco architecture in Nevada
Railroad bridges on the National Register of Historic Places in Nevada
Concrete bridges in the United States
Buildings and structures in Las Vegas